The 2011 season was the Brisbane Lions' 15th season in the Australian Football League. The club also participated in the pre-season NAB Cup and, after getting knocked out in the first round, the NAB Challenge.

The club finished 15th in the regular season, recording only 4 wins, their worst result since 1998.

2011 Playing List

Player changes for 2011

In

Out

Pre-Season Results

NAB Cup

Round 1

NAB Challenge

Week 1

Week 2

Week 3

Regular season

Home and Away season

Round 1

Round 2

Round 3

Round 4

Round 5

Round 6

Round 7

Round 8

Round 9

Round 10

Round 11

Round 12

Round 13

Round 14

Round 15

Round 16

Round 17

Round 18

Round 19

Round 20

Round 21

Round 22

Round 23

Round 24

Ladder

Leading Goalkickers

Awards and Milestones

Awards

Milestones

References

External links 
 2011 NAB Cup Fixture
 2011 AFL Fixture

Brisbane Lions
Brisbane Lions seasons